Klyuchi Air Base is in Kamchatka Krai, Russia located  southwest of the settlement of Klyuchi. It is a small but significant interceptor airfield covering northern Kamchatka, probably to defend international borders during nearby missile testing operations at Kura Missile Test Range 130 km to the northeast. Klyuchi contains about twelve fighter revetments and some narrow tarmac space.

The base is home to a Composite Aviation Squadron of the 35th Independent Transport Composite Aviation Regiment.

Early US satellite imagery showed the airfield was constructed in 1963, replacing an old airfield about 10 miles (16 km) to the east-southeast.  In another satellite pass in 1966, analysts saw mostly transports such as the Lisunov Li-2, an Antonov An-2 (ASCC: Colt), and a helicopter.

References

Russian Air Force bases
Soviet Air Force bases
Soviet Air Defence Force bases
Airports built in the Soviet Union
Airports in Kamchatka Krai